Houstonia rosea, the rose bluet, is a North American plant species in the  coffee family. It is a tiny plant only a few centimeters tall, with pink flowers. It is native to the south-central United States: Texas, Oklahoma, Arkansas, Louisiana, Mississippi, Alabama and southern Missouri.

References

External links
Photo of herbarium specimen at Missouri Botanical Garden, collected in Missouri, Houstonia rosea
Gardening Europe

rosea
Flora of the Southeastern United States
Flora of the United States
Plants described in 1817
Flora without expected TNC conservation status